Iskre (English: The Sparks) were a Yugoslav rock band formed in Belgrade in 1961. Iskre were one of Yugoslavia's earliest rock bands and are notable for being one of the pioneers of the Yugoslav rock scene.

History

1961-1966
The band was officially formed in 1961 by the students of Belgrade's Second Gymnasium: Slavoljub Bogdanović (rhythm guitar), Miloš Sekulić (guitar), Gligorije Milanović (bass guitar), and Draško Reljin (drums), although the members of the band started to perform together two years earlier, performing on school parties on acoustic instruments. The band choose their name after Iskra amplifiers (originally designed for movie theaters) they used at the beginning of their career. Iskre started their career by playing instrumentals inspired by the music of The Tornados, Johnny and the Hurricanes, The Champs, The Coasters, The Drifters, Santo & Johnny, and soon achieved notable popularity.

At the 1962 May Youth Festival, held at Belgrade's Trade Union Hall, they won the first place. On the festival, they met organist Branislav "Beka" Nikolić, who decided to leave his band 3+1 and join Iskre. This lineup of the band held rehearsals in Sekulić's house, but, as the neighbors complained, they were forced to find another space for rehearsals. Luckily, Radio Belgrade invited them to become the official musical ensemble of Radio Belgrade Youth, granting them space for rehearsals. The started performing on matinée dances in the club Terazije, at pop concerts and on Radio Belgrade. Iskre were one of the first Yugoslav rock bands that performed as a backing band on the recordings of pop music singers; during their existence they recorded with Zafir Hadžimanov (covers of Cliff Richard songs), Ivanka Pavlović, Zoran Rambosek, and others.

During 1963, female vocalist Brankica Sučević, who was a member of the band Safiri (The Sapphires), occasionally performed with Iskre. The band wanted to record their debut EP with her, but the editors of Diskos record label insisted that the band record the EP with the then-popular female singer Ivanka Pavlović. The EP, featuring the songs "Mala Šeila" ("Little Sheila"), "Locomotion" (a cover of Little Eva song), "Peppermint Twist" (a cover of Joey Dee and the Starliters song), and "Slušaj pesmu" ("Listen to the Song"), was eventually released under Ivanka Pavlović's name only and soon became the second best-selling Yugoslav pop music record. After the recording of the EP, Milanović left the band, and was replaced by a former Duet M member Dragan Mirković.

In January 1964, the band won the first place at the Parada ritma (Parade of Rhythm) festival held at Trade Union Hall. On Parada ritma, which was the first rock festival held in Yugoslavia and arguably the first rock festival in a communist country, Iskre performed alongside Safiri, Lutalice, Zlatni Dečaci and Ivanka Pavlović & Valjevski Dečaci. Several months later, Iskre held their first solo concert at Ilija M. Kolarac Endowment, and soon after released their official debut EP, with songs "Stalaktit" ("Stalactite", a cover of a Les Aiglons song), "Šeba" ("Sheeba"), "Rock za dobro jutro" ("Good Morning Rock") and "Zvončići" ("Little Bells"). After the release of the EP, Mirković left the band, and was replaced by a former Siluete and Lutalice member Branko Gluščević.

During 1965, Iskre recorded two EPs, both featuring four songs, three of them being instrumental tracks. During the same year they appeared in Toma Janić's film Glasam za ljubav (I Give My Vote to Love), becoming the first Yugoslav rock band to appear on film. However, at this time the band's popularity declined due to the growing popularity of new rock genres. The band wanted to release two more EPs, the first one with covers of Macedonian traditional songs, but their record label, Diskos, refused to pay for the recording because of the low sales of Iskre's previous two records. At the beginning of 1966, Iskre performed at Belgrade Gitarijada festival where they won the fifth place. Soon after they disbanded.

Post breakup
Gluščević continued his career in bands Dah and Rokeri s Moravu. Mirković played in Nena Ivošević's backing orchestra, and during the 1990s he was the president of the Association of Jazz and Popular Music Artists of Yugoslavia.

Draško Reljin died in 2020.

Discography

EPs
Stalaktit (1964)
Tequila (1965)
Bossa nova (1965)

References

External links 
 Iskre at Discogs

Serbian rock music groups
Yugoslav rock music groups
Instrumental rock musical groups
Musical groups from Belgrade
Musical groups established in 1961
Musical groups disestablished in 1966
1961 establishments in Yugoslavia